Parribacus is a genus of slipper lobsters, containing six species, all of which are used locally as human food sources.

References

Achelata
Taxa described in 1852
Taxa named by James Dwight Dana